Billmore Hollow is a valley in Oregon County in the U.S. state of Missouri.

Billmore Hollow is an amalgamation of the name of William "Bill" Moore, a pioneer citizen who settled in the area after the Civil War. Billmore post office and Billmore school were established in the area.

References

Valleys of Oregon County, Missouri
Valleys of Missouri